The Mineros de Fresnillo Fútbol Club, commonly known as Mineros, is a Mexican football club based in Fresnillo, Zacatecas. The club was founded in 2007, and currently plays in the Serie A of Liga Premier.

History 
Mineros de Fresnillo was founded in 2007. In 2013 the team was registered in the Liga de Nuevos Talentos. In the Torneo Apertura 2014, the team was the division champion.

In 2015, Mineros de Fresnillo was promoted to Liga Premier de Ascenso after defeating Sahuayo F.C. in the promotion playoff, however, the team had to stay one more season in Liga de nuevos Talentos while modernizing their stadium to do it according to the requirements of the league.

In the 2016-17 season, the team made its debut in the Liga Premier de Ascenso, in the Clausura 2017 tournament Fresnillo was classified to the league for the championship, it was eliminated in the quarterfinals by Pioneros de Cancún. Although Mineros de Fresnillo had retained its place in the Liga Premier de México, before the start of the 2017-18 season the team was relegated to Serie B for not meeting the requirements established by the new Liga Premier de México. But invited back for the 2019-20 season, which was abandoned due to Covid-19 pandemic. 

In July 2021, the team became a squad affiliated to Mineros de Zacatecas, after the Zacatecan team took over Mineros de Fresnillo because it stopped receiving financial support from the mining company.

Players

Current squad

References

External links 

Association football clubs established in 2007
Football clubs in Zacatecas
2007 establishments in Mexico
Liga Premier de México